The Cuba men's national water polo team is the representative for Cuba in international men's water polo.

Results

Olympic Games
1968 — 8th place
1972 — 9th place
1976 — 7th place
1980 — 5th place
1992 — 8th place
Water polo at the Friendship Games

Friendship Games
1984 — 3rd place

World Championship
1973 — 6th place
1975 — 4th place
1978 — 10th place
1982 — 5th place
1986 — 7th place
1991 — 11th place
1994 — 11th place
2005 — 12th place

FINA Water Polo World Cup 
 1981 —  Bronze medal
 1983 — 8th place
 1987 — 7th place
 1993 — 8th place

Notable players
 Iván Pérez  (later Spain)
 Amaurys Pérez (later Italy)
 Juan Domínguez

See also
Cuba women's national water polo team

References

 
Men's national water polo teams
Men's sport in Cuba